Kiss (Korea International Super Star, stylized as KISS) was a South Korean female pop trio. Their debut single "Because I'm a Girl" was a 2001 hit.  The music video stars actress Goo Hye-Joo, and actor Shin Hyun-joon, which increased initial public interest in the song.  The song remained a karaoke staple in Korea for many years.

This helped to launch the career of Kiss, with an album quickly following. However, the group quickly disbanded afterwards, due to internal conflict that could not be resolved.

After the group's break-up, Umji became an actress and married, Jini returned to the States and continued her singing career.

"Because I'm a Girl" has been covered by numerous artists, including South Korean female duo 2NB and solo singer Ben.

The group reunited to perform their main hit "Because I'm a Girl" on June 21, 2016 through variety show Two Yoo Project Sugar Man (Episode 36). It was revealed on the show the reason for the group's breakup was surfacing of news that one of the members was dating, a matter that Korean label companies usually controls tightly on their talents.

Discography

Studio Album

References

Musical groups disestablished in 2002
Musical groups established in 2001
K-pop music groups
South Korean girl groups
2001 establishments in South Korea
2002 disestablishments in South Korea